The 1956 All-Ireland Minor Football Championship was the 25th staging of the All-Ireland Minor Football Championship, the Gaelic Athletic Association's premier inter-county Gaelic football tournament for boys under the age of 18.

Dublin entered the championship as defending champions.

On 7 October 1956, Dublin won the championship following a 5-14 to 2-2 defeat of Leitrim in the All-Ireland final. This was their fifth All-Ireland title overall and their third in succession.

Results

Connacht Minor Football Championship

Quarter-Final

Mayo 2-10 Galway 2-6

Semi-Finals

Roscommon 1-9 Mayo 1-5.

Sligo 4-6 Leitrim 1-8 Ballinamore Replay.

Final

Roscommon 2-7 Sligo 1-6 Sligo.

Munster Minor Football Championship

Leinster Minor Football Championship

Ulster Minor Football Championship

All-Ireland Minor Football Championship

Semi-Finals

Leitrim 1-9 Donegal 2-1

Final

Championship statistics

Miscellaneous

 In the provincial championships there are a number of firsts as Donegal and Limerick win the respective Ulster and Munster titles for the first time.
 Dublin become the first team to win three successive All-Ireland titles.

References

1956
All-Ireland Minor Football Championship